Sinclaire Johnson (born April 13, 1998) is an American middle-distance runner. She competed in the 1500 meters at the 2022 World Athletics Championships, where she qualified for the final. She also won the same event at the 2022 USA Outdoor Track and Field Championships.

Johnson was raised in Altamonte Springs, Florida and competed for the Oklahoma State University (OSU) indoor track, outdoor track, and cross country teams. Following her time at OSU, she joined the Bowerman Track Club in Portland, Oregon in 2019. In 2021, she left Bowerman to join the Nike Union Athletics Club and is training with coach Pete Julian.

References 

Living people
American female middle-distance runners
Oklahoma State Cowgirls track and field athletes
Sportspeople from Indianapolis
Track and field athletes from Indianapolis
1998 births
World Athletics Championships athletes for the United States
21st-century American women